County Westmeath was a constituency represented in the Irish House of Commons until the Act of Union in 1800. Between 1725 and 1793 Catholics and those married to Catholics could not vote. Under the terms of the Act of Union 1800, it was succeeded by the Westminter constituency of County Westmeath.

Members of Parliament
It returned two members to the Parliament of Ireland.

1560
Sir Thomas Nugent
Sir George Stanley
1585
Edward Nugent of Dysert
Edward Nugent of Morton
1613–1615 
Sir Christopher Nugent of Meyrath 
Edward Nugent of Portloman (died and replaced 1615 by Edmond Nugent of Roconnel)
1634–1635
Sir James Dillon
1639–1649
Sir James Dillon (expelled 1642 as rebel)
Sir Luke Fitzgerald of Tecroghan (expelled 1642 as rebel)
1661–1666
William Handcock
Thomas Longe

1689–1801

Notes

References

Constituencies of the Parliament of Ireland (pre-1801)
Historic constituencies in County Westmeath
1611 establishments in Ireland
1800 disestablishments in Ireland
Constituencies established in 1611
Constituencies disestablished in 1800